Difang Duana (March 20, 1921 – March 29, 2002) and Igay Duana (August 9, 1922 – May 16, 2002), Chinese names Kuo Ying-nan (郭英男) and Kuo Hsiu-chu (郭秀珠), were Amis husband and wife farmers from Taiwan who became known as a folk music duo who specialized in traditional Amis chants. Their most recognized work is a performance of a traditional Amis Palang song, alternately called "Weeding and Paddyfield Song No. 1", "Elders' Drinking Song", and "Jubilant Drinking Song", or Sapiliepah a Radiw in the Amis language. The song was recorded by a French government project and EMI, and was subsequently sampled by the musical project Enigma for their international hit single "Return to Innocence". Accusations of unintentional usage without permission were settled out of court.

Musical career
In 1988, Difang and Igay traveled to France to sing on tour organized by ethnomusicologist Hsu Tsang-Houei, during which they and around 30 other aboriginal Taiwanese artists were paid $15 a day. Their performances were recorded by the Maison des Cultures du Monde ("Institute for World Cultures"), part of the French Ministère de L'éducation Nationale ("National Education Ministry"), and put onto an "anonymous" compilation of "Taiwanese aboriginal songs" to be used for educational purposes. Six years later, Michael Cretu, the creative mind behind the Ibiza-based Romanian/German musical project Enigma, believing the recording to be in the public domain, sampled the recording on his song "Return to Innocence".  After Taiwanese press agencies identified the Duanas' performance, the couple were offered a contract with Magic Stone, a subsidiary of the Taiwanese indie label, Rock Records; their music achieved little exposure outside of Taiwan.

In 1998, the Duanas filed suit against Cretu and EMI for violation of copyright. The suit was settled out of court in July 1999 for an undisclosed amount. The couple reportedly used some of the money to set up a scholarship fund for Amis children. Magic Stone's attorney also won a suit against the French government, but the government insisted on giving the money to a folk art foundation in trust, and not to the Duanas. In response to the lawsuits, Robin Lee, director of Taiwan's Association of Recording Copyright Owners, claimed that since performers of traditional folk music aren't authors, they have no copyright. Lee was wrong because the standard practice is to list the music as traditional (no copyright), but the arrangement of it as copyrighted. The Duanas have been credited on all subsequent releases of the song.

The media attention garnered by the Duanas' legal case piqued public interest in their music. Dan Lacksman of Deep Forest, in collaboration with Magic Stone Records and the Duanas, produced the ethnic electronica album, Circle of Life. The album was released in 1998 under the artist name Difang, though both Difang and Igay perform on the record. A second album, Across the Yellow Earth, was released in 2001.

Deaths
Difang died on March 29, 2002, from sepsis. He had struggled with diabetes for many years, and his health deteriorated significantly after he was bitten by a venomous centipede in October of the previous year. Igay died shortly thereafter, on May 16, 2002, after a lengthy battle with breast cancer. She had been initially diagnosed on July 8, 1996.

Discography
 Uncredited ("anonymous") recording in Polyphonies vocales des aborigènes de Taïwan, Ministère de l'éducation nationale, 1988
 "Return to Innocence", EMI Records, 1993
 Circle of Life, Magic Stone Records, 1998 (reached No. 1 in Japan and Taiwan)
 Across the Yellow Earth, Magic Stone Records, 2001

References

External links

 Article in Travel in Taiwan
 Article at Taiwan First Nations
 Article in Taiwan Review
  Artist page on GoGoRock
 

Amis people
Copyright infringement
Taiwanese singers
People from Taitung County
20th-century Chinese singers